"Cahaya Di Langit Itu" is a song performed by singer Fatin Shidqia. This single featured on her debut album titled For You. The single was released in Indonesia on 22 November 2013 and became the original soundtrack for the movie 99 Cahaya di Langit Eropa (99 Lights in the European Sky).

Music video
Video Clip of this song was made while Fatin was shooting a scene for a film titled 99 Cahaya di Langit Eropa. The location of this video clip was shot in the city of Vienna, Austria. This video clip was officially released by Sony Music Entertainment Indonesia through YouTube account on November 22, 2013.

Track listing
Digital download
 Cahaya di Langit Itu - 4:39

Awards and nominations

References

2013 songs
2013 singles
Sony Music singles